

List of presidents

References

University of Southern Maine presidents
Southern Maine, University Of